The United States Patent Association was a non-governmental organization active in the United States in the late 19th century.  Their purpose was to promote the benefits of patents for society.  Association membership comprised US patent examiners, patent agents and attorneys and inventors.  Their activities included having meetings, giving public presentations and publishing essays.

Essays
Perry, John, S., "A Defence of our Patent System",  United States Patent Association, J.R. Osgood & Co., of Boston, Mass., 1875 
Howson, H., "Our Country's Debt to Patents", United States Patent Association, J.R. Osgood & Co., of Boston, Mass., 1875 
Howson, Henry, Sr.  “What we owe to patents”, U.S. Patent Association, M'Calla & Stavely, 1874.

Former officers and directors
Norman C. Stiles inventor and founder of Stiles & Parker Press Company of Middletown, Connecticut

Modern stock scams using the name of the United States Patent Association

Certain promoters of stocks claim that their companies have “patents registered with the States Patent Association”.  This is a meaningless designation because:
The United States Patent Association does not exist anymore, and
There is no such thing as "holding patents with an association".  Patents are issued by governments only.

See also
 Intellectual property organization
 Patent
 Scams in intellectual property

References 
 

Defunct organizations based in the United States
Intellectual property organizations